Francisco Hernández Ramírez (11 July 1949 – 7 January 2019) was a professional football player from Costa Rica.

Club career
Hernández played during the 70s and 80s with Costa Rica's national team and for Saprissa, winning a total of eight titles with them, including the six consecutive championships won by Saprissa from 1972 to 1977, a record both in Costa Rica as well as in the Americas. His brother,  Fernando Hernández, El Príncipe, played for Saprissa too. He retired on 27 November 1983.

International career
Hernández played 31 matches for Costa Rica and scored 5 goals. He represented his country in two FIFA World Cup qualification matches and also played for Costa Rica at the 1980 Summer Olympics.

Honours
Deportivo Saprissa
 Central American Club Championship (3): 1972, 1973, 1978
 Primera División de Costa Rica (8): 1969, 1972, 1973, 1974, 1975, 1976, 1977, 1982
 Costa Rican Cup (2): 1970, 1972
 Costa Rican Super Cup: 1976

References

See also

Francisco Hernández's obituary 

1949 births
2019 deaths
Association football forwards
Costa Rican footballers
Costa Rica international footballers
Olympic footballers of Costa Rica
Footballers at the 1980 Summer Olympics
Deportivo Saprissa players
Expatriate football managers in Mexico
Costa Rican football managers